Jim & Jennie and the Pinetops is an American bluegrass group from Philadelphia, Pennsylvania, United States.

History
Jim Krewson first played bluegrass in a group called the Slobber Mountain Boys; Jennie Bedford learned bluegrass from her father, a banjo player. The two first met in New York City in 1998 and began playing together with banjo player Brad Hutchison and bassist Brendan Skwire. They recorded their first album under the name Jim & Jennie and the Pine Barons, released in 1999; two further albums would follow on Overcoat Recordings before landing an album on Bloodshot Records in 2005, touring the US all the while (including dates with Neko Case) and encountering significant media exposure.

Members
Jim Krewson - vocals, guitar
Jennie Benford - vocals, mandolin
Brendan Skwire - bass
Brad Hutchison - banjo
Matt Downing - bass

Discography
Jim & Jennie and the Pine Barons (Phovsho Records, 1999)
Little Birdie (Overcoat Recordings, 2000)
One More in the Cabin (Overcoat, 2002)
Rivers Roll On By (Bloodshot Records, 2005)

References

[ AllMusic] profile
PopMatters performance review
Pitchfork review 1
Pitchfork review 2

American bluegrass music groups
Musical groups from Philadelphia
Bloodshot Records artists